Croombimbie is a Parish of Ularara County in north west New South Wales.
 
Located at 29°56′19″S 143°14′03″E on the Bootra Creek the main  economic activity of the parish is agriculture.
The climate is semi-arid, featuring low rainfall, very hot summer temperatures and cool nights in winter. The parish has a Köppen climate classification of BWh (Hot desert).

References

Parishes of Ularara County
Far West (New South Wales)